The 1949 Challenge Desgrange-Colombo was the second edition of the Challenge Desgrange-Colombo. It included ten races: all nine races from the 1948 edition were retained and the Tour de Suisse added. The competition was won by Fausto Coppi of the Bianchi–Ursus who won four of the ten rounds: Milan–San Remo, the Giro d'Italia, the Tour de France and the Giro di Lombardia.

Races

Final standings

Riders

Nations

References

 
Challenge Desgrange-Colombo
Challenge Desgrange-Colombo